Barcaldine Downs is a former rural locality in the Barcaldine Region, Queensland, Australia.

On 22 November 2019 the Queensland Government decided to amalgamate the localities in the Barcaldine Region, resulting in five expanded localities based on the larger towns: Alpha, Aramac, Barcaldine, Jericho and Muttaburra. Barcaldine Downs was incorporated into Barcaldine.

Geography 
The Barcaldine Isisford Road passes through the locality, entering the locality from the north-east (Barcaldine) and exits to the south-west (Ilfracombe).

The Alice River flows through the locality entering the locality from the east (Patrick) and exiting to the south on the boundary of Ilfracombe and Moombria where it becomes a tributary to the Barcoo River.

The principal land use is grazing on native vegetation.

History 
The locality is presumably named after the large pastoral property Barcaldine Downs within its boundaries. It was established as a sheep station in 1863 by Donald Charles Cameron, whose family property in Ayrshire, Scotland, which was named for Barcaldine, Argyll and Bute, Scotland.

Education 
There are no schools in Barcaldine Downs. The nearest primary schools are in Barcaldine, Isisford and Ilfracombe. The nearest secondary schools are in Barcaldine and Longreach.

References 

Barcaldine Region
Unbounded localities in Queensland